Norman William "Bill" Dornblaser (born November 4, 1933) is an American water polo player who competed in the 1952 Summer Olympics.

He was born in Hawthorne, California.  Dornblaser graduated from El Segundo High School.

Dornblaser was a member of the American water polo team which finished fourth in the 1952 tournament. He played seven matches.

External links
profile

1933 births
Living people
American male water polo players
El Segundo High School alumni
Olympic water polo players of the United States
Water polo players at the 1952 Summer Olympics
Sportspeople from Hawthorne, California